Leah Burke (born 6 November 1998) is an  international rugby league footballer who plays at domestic level for St Helens.

Born in Leigh, Lancashire Burke was an artistic gymnast for many years competing in several English championships.

Diagnosed with a stress fracture in her lower back when she was 16, Burke retired from gymnastics. At 18 Burke went to Leeds Beckett University and started playing rugby union. At the suggestion of her sister, Rhianna, Burke went along to a trial rugby league session at St Helens and was signed by the club. Burke made her debut for St Helens in the 2018 Women's Super League.  Since then Burke has been a regular in the St Helens side making 53 appearances by the end of the 2022 Women's Super League season and scoring 50 tries.

In 2019 Burke was selected for the England team and made her international debut against  in November 2019.  Burke's second international was in June 2022 against . Burke was also chosen for the England squad for the 2019 Rugby League World Cup 9s scoring a try in England's first group game versus Papua New Guinea. 

Burke was chosen for the England squad for the 2021 Women's Rugby League World Cup and scored six tries in England's four matches, including a hat-trick against Papua New Guinea.

References

Living people
1998 births
Rugby league players from Leigh, Greater Manchester
England women's national rugby league team players
St Helens Women RLFC players
Rugby league wingers
Alumni of Leeds Beckett University